The Fearsome Five is a group of supervillains from DC Comics who serve as enemies of the Teen Titans.

Publication history
They were created by George Pérez and Marv Wolfman, and first appeared in The New Teen Titans #3 (January 1981), going on to become recurring adversaries for that superhero group. Though deadly, they lack sophistication as criminal planners, a cohesive focus or loyalty, and are prone to in-fighting, backstabbing, and disbandment.

Fictional team history
The Fearsome Five were founded by the criminal Doctor Light, through an ad he placed in the Underworld Star, a criminal underground newsletter. Light formed the group to attack the Teen Titans, but Psimon, who was under the influence of the demon from whom he had received his superhuman abilities called Trigon, usurped Light’s role as leader, and the two would continue to struggle for some time over it.

After Psimon's having been banished by Trigon to another dimension for his failure to destroy the Earth, the other members of the Five later attacked the Titans at their newly unveiled headquarters, Titans Tower, in The New Teen Titans #7 (May 1981), using Silas Stone, the father of the superhero Teen Titan, Cyborg, and the Titans’ dimensional transmitter to return the apparently alive Psimon back to them. The Five were again defeated. Psimon later allied himself with the immortal dimensional traveler known as the Monitor during the seminal 1985 event known as Crisis on Infinite Earths. Feeling betrayed, the rest of the Five turned on Psimon and apparently murdered him.

In The New Teen Titans #37 (December 1983) and Batman and the Outsiders #5 (December 1983), the Five turned on Light, expelling him from the group and trying to kill him, but Light escaped, and Psimon again became leader, though the Five were again defeated, this time by the Titans, Batman, and the Outsiders. The Five later invaded S.T.A.R. Labs in Tales of the Teen Titans #56-58 (August–October 1985), freeing Jinx and Neutron, who had been imprisoned there, and taking them into their ranks, but were defeated again by the Titans, and unsuccessfully fought Superman in The Adventures of Superman #430 (July 1987), this time with new members Charger and Deuce, but were dispatched by him as well.

The team disbanded shortly after Deuce and Charger’s first missions with the Five, with Mammoth and Shimmer deciding to renounce their life of crime and finding peace in a Tibetan monastery. Psimon returned from outer space, quite alive, and systematically sought revenge on his former teammates, Gizmo, Mammoth and Shimmer. Mammoth barely survived a spear rammed through his head by Psimon, but Shimmer was turned into glass and then shattered by the telepath, and seemingly perished. Psimon shrunk Gizmo down to subatomic size, but the diminutive tinkerer found a way to return to normal size; he was later incarcerated, along with Mammoth and Jinx, at the metahuman prison on Alcatraz. Psimon himself was incarcerated at another such prison called the Slab, but later escaped when it was destroyed in Outsiders (vol. 3) #6 (January 2004).

Soon after, in a storyline in Outsiders (vol. 3) #13 -15 (August–October 2004), frequent Captain Marvel archenemy Doctor Sivana gathered Psimon, freed Mammoth, Gizmo and Jinx from prison, and was able to successfully restore Shimmer’s shattered form, returning her to life, and put the team to work for him in a scheme to short sell Lexcorp stock by having them steal its accounts from its corporate building in Metropolis, and then driving down the stock by killing all the people in the building, and destroying two other Lexcorp properties. At the latter of the two, a microchip processor factory of Lexcorp's subsidiary, Kellacor, the Five were confronted by the Outsiders. After escaping, the criminally unsophisticated Five urged Sivana to take Lexcorp's nuclear missile facility near Joshua Tree, California. When Sivana refused, Psimon asserted that they would take it anyway, and in response, Sivana killed Gizmo with a laser blast to the head, and severed relations with the remaining four, warning them that he would kill them if they ever crossed his path again. Sivana used the money he made from the scheme to purchase a tropical island off the coast of Thailand to use as his lair, but the Five were defeated in their plan to take the facility and fire a nuclear missile at Canada. Mammoth was returned to the metahuman prison on Alcatraz Island, but the other three remain at large.

Sivana sarcastically suggested after killing Gizmo that the team rename themselves to the Fearsome Four. The Fearsome Five next turn up in Villains United #5 (November 2005), wherein they are working for the Secret Society of Super Villains. This time around, they are led by Psimon, and the only three other members of the roster are Mammoth, Shimmer, and Jinx.

One Year Later, Doctor Light, Dr. Sivana, Psimon, Neutron, Mammoth, Shimmer and Jinx are seen on the prison planet in Salvation Run. In #2, Psimon is interrupted by the Joker, who apparently murders him by breaking the dome which houses his brain and smashing it with a rock, repeatedly. In the final issue of the miniseries, Neutron is used by Lex Luthor as a power source for a teleportation device, and is seemingly killed when it self-destructs.

A new Fearsome Five surfaced following the Final Crisis, formed by the Calculator, the members shown so far are Mammoth, Shimmer, Jinx, and new members Nano and Rumble. Nano and Rumble were two inmates of Alcatraz that Shimmer recruited to the team, Nano having been put into jail after battling Cyborg.

The New 52
In The New 52 reboot of DC's continuity, the "Forever Evil" storyline introduces the Fearsome Five (consisting of Gizmo, Jinx, Mammoth, Psimon and Shimmer) when they are recruited by the Crime Syndicate of America to join the Secret Society of Super Villains.

In Justice League (vol. 2) #29, The Fearsome Five were sent among Doctor Psycho and Hector Hammond to fight against Cyborg and the Metal Men. They are easily defeated by The Metal Men because the Metal Men are not vulnerable to mental attacks.

Roster

First Fearsome Five
 Doctor Light - Founding member. He fled following a struggle to be the leader of the group.
 Gizmo
 Shimmer
 Mammoth (Baran Flinders)
 Psimon
 Jinx
 Neutron (Nat Tryon)

Second Fearsome Five
 Mammoth
 Gizmo
 Shimmer
 Deuce and Charger

Third Fearsome Five
 Doctor Sivana (Thaddeus Bodog Sivana) - Leader
 Gizmo
 Mammoth
 Psimon
 Sabbac
 Shimmer
 Jinx

Fourth Fearsome Five
 The Calculator (Noah Kuttler) - Leader, formed this new version.
 Jinx
 Mammoth
 Nano (Virgil Adams) - A scientist who created the nano-suit worn by him. His only weakness so far is the use of a killcode in his indestructible, incorruptible suit: Josephine, the name of his pet bird, which is the only love he has left in the world after making the suit.
 Rumble (John Doe) - A guy in a power suit that gives him the powers of super-strength and sonic blasts.
 Shimmer

Fifth Fearsome Five (The New 52)
 Psimon
 Jinx
 Mammoth
 Gizmo
 Shimmer

In other media

Television
 A variation of the Fearsome Five called the H.I.V.E. Five appear in Teen Titans, initially consisting of former H.I.V.E. Academy students Gizmo, Jinx, Mammoth, See-More, and Private H.I.V.E. After Private H.I.V.E. leaves the group off-screen, Billy Numerous and Kyd Wykkyd take his place, though the group still refer to themselves as the H.I.V.E. Five. Following an encounter with Kid Flash and the H.I.V.E. Five joining the Brotherhood of Evil, Jinx leaves the group to help the Teen Titans defeat the Brotherhood and her former teammates.
 The H.I.V.E. Five appears in Teen Titans Go!, consisting of Jinx, Gizmo, Mammoth, See-More, and Billy Numerous.

Video games
The Fearsome Five appears in DC Universe Online, consisting of Doctor Light, Mammoth, Gizmo, Jinx, and Psimon.

Miscellaneous
The Fearsome Five appear in Teen Titans Go!, consisting of Psimon, Doctor Light, Gizmo, Mammoth, and Jinx, the last of whom is working undercover to undermine the group on the Teen Titans' behalf.

Allusions outside DC Comics
An unrelated Fearsome Five appear in the Darkwing Duck two-part episode "Just Us Justice Ducks", consisting of the titular hero's enemies Negaduck, Megavolt, Quackerjack, Bushroot, and the Liquidator.

References

DC Comics supervillain teams
DC Comics titles
Comics characters introduced in 1981
Characters created by George Pérez
Characters created by Marv Wolfman